For Ramsgate as a whole, see the main article Ramsgate.

Ramsgate as a name has its earliest reference as 'Ramisgate' or 'Remmesgate' in 1275, from Anglo-Saxon 'Hraefn's geat, or 'Raven's cliff gap', later to be rendered 'Ramesgate' from 1357.

Georgian & Regency Ramsgate
Before the accession of George III, Ramsgate was little more than an off-shoot of the parish of St Lawrence, under the jurisdiction of Sandwich.  But doctors were starting to advocate the benefits of sea-bathing as an all-round tonic and a cure for a wide variety of ailments. So, by the 1750s, seaside towns and hamlets were vying with each other to attract wealthy visitors. The first recorded evidence of this fad in Ramsgate was in 1764, when James Hawkesley was “rated” for two sheds where female clients could undress and wait for a bathing machine to become vacant. Papers, periodicals and refreshments were available and there were boatmen for hire to row gentlemen bathers out into deeper water.
The business grew and by the beginning of the 19th century, the number of bathing machines on offer at Ramsgate sands had risen to over 20.  The new proprietors, Messrs Barling, Foat and Wells, replaced the sheds with more respectable “Bathing Rooms” and removed the chalk promontory to put in a small row of shops, a bazaar and even a billiard room.

At the same time, Ramsgate began to construct a new harbour.  Following the calamitous storm of 1748, a petition was sent to Parliament to build a safe haven at Ramsgate for vessels navigating the Thanet coast and the Goodwin Sands. Despite fierce opposition to the idea from Sandwich, the required act was eventually passed and work started on the port in 1760. It was not a resounding success, as it was in constant danger of being overwhelmed by silt.  So in 1774, John Smeaton, the pre-eminent civil engineer of his age, was consulted on the problem.  After a number of false starts, Smeaton's new designs for a harbour with piers, sluices and an inner basin were adopted and the bulk of the work was completed by 1790.

But the threat of invasion postponed any further commercial building in favour of the construction of coastal defences.  Ramsgate played a pivotal role in the Napoleonic Wars. The naval harbour and garrisons on both cliffs changed the town from a small fashionable watering hole to a place of some military and social consequence in Regency society. 
The heir to the Duke of Hamilton occupied Mount Albion House, followed by Lady Augusta Murray, sometime wife to Frederick Augustus, the 6th son of George III.  Sir William Curtis sumptuously entertained the Prince Regent (George IV) at Cliff House. And the Duke of Clarence (William IV) held a ball at Bear's Albion Hotel in 1811, which according to the Times: “in fashion, splendour and elegance exceed anything of the kind ever witnessed in that part of the Kingdom”.

From 1803 to 1807, East Cliff Lodge was the headquarters of Admiral Keith, commanding the North Sea and Channel Fleets. And during the same period, Jane Austen’s brother, Francis, organised a corps of “Sea Fencibles” (a sort of naval militia/Dad's Army) from the town to protect the South Coast of Britain from invasion. Between 1804 and 1816, over 300 transports came to Ramsgate Harbour to embark more than 50,000 men, horses and materials to the continent. The largest troop movement occurred in 1809, when the disastrous Walcheren Expedition attempted to secure the Dutch island and the port of Flushing.  Many of the sick and wounded were returned to Ramsgate, only to die in large numbers and be buried in St Laurence Churchyard.

As the Napoleonic Wars reached a climax, the movement of troops continued. One small boy recalls watching infantry march 6-abreast through the town in lines reaching back from the pier gates to Nethercourt Toll Bar. While Kenneth Beacham Martin (later deputy Harbour Master) remembers the Household Cavalry and Royal Dragoons descending from their barracks on West Cliff to embark on 34 vessels heading for Ostend in the spring of 1815 to join Wellington and to eventually fight in the battle of Waterloo.

In 1821, George IV acceded to the thrones of Britain, Ireland and Hanover. So, to be “elected” in his other dominion, the Royal Squadron departed for the continent from Ramsgate.  But the new King was so gratified by the hospitality and congratulations he received from the town that on his return the monarch made Ramsgate a “Royal Harbour” – a designation that is still unique in mainland Britain.

But after the Congress of Vienna, Ramsgate's military importance declined sharply as the threat from France ended and Britain's focus of attention switched from Europe to the colonies.  The barracks, stables, parade grounds and gun batteries etc. were sold off to developers and an intense period of building followed. 
 
The stimulus was the arrival of a steamboat service from London to Margate in 1816. Instead of spending a day in a bumpy coach to Brighton, wealthy seaside visitors could now cruise down the Thames to Thanet in just four hours of comfort and luxury. So the best of society chose to enjoy a month or two's relaxation from “the cares and anxieties of Metropolitan life” in Ramsgate. 
 
Before 1790, there was not a single dwelling of substance on either cliff. By the time Queen Victoria came to the throne in 1837, Ramsgate was covered with elegant crescents, squares, places and lawns, all with fine bow-fronted Regency houses, embellished by delicate gossamer ironwork and Pagoda-style canopied balconies. To the extent, the town now has more listed buildings from this period per capita than Bath.

Officially, the Ramsgate season ran from August to October. But many regular visitors like Samuel Taylor Coleridge preferred to sojourn in late Autumn.  Mainly, as a matter of economy. A house on Nelson or Wellington crescent could command a rent of £16 a month – five or six times more than a gentleman would expect to pay for an equivalent family residence in London.  But by November, Coleridge could take a room on the cliff for 10s 6d a week and dine out on his table talk.

In its heyday as a fashionable watering place, Ramsgate attracted both new money and old.  Two of the richest men in the kingdom, Sir William Curtis and Moses Montefiore had large establishments on West Cliff and East Cliff respectively. While down in the town, you might find the Prime Minister, Lord Liverpool strolling along the pier, arm in arm, with his Foreign Secretary, George Canning.  Or you could share a warm seawater tub with the Marquess of Wellesley or the Duke of Clarence at Dyason's Baths. Or you could just watch the “Heir Presumptive” enjoying a donkey ride on the beach.

Princess Victoria first came to Ramsgate in 1823 when she was only four years old and was a regular visitor throughout her childhood, staying at Albion House and Townley House on Chatham Street.  Such holidays provided the young princess with some respite from her bleak and over-regimented upbringing. So even as Queen, Victoria always loved the town and cherished fond memories of the seaside, where she was occasionally allowed to play in the sands with her dog or briefly mix with other children.

But ironically, Victoria's reign brought to an end Ramsgate's status as a stylish holiday resort.  As medicine progressed, the benefits of seawater were discounted.  And with the boom in railways, a host of other locations were suddenly within easy and comfortable reach of London.  Instead of taking the waters, new fashions emerged among the rich and wealthy – like the country weekend, or a day at the races or a week at the tables. While Royalty now preferred the French Riviera to the North Sea coast.
Rents fell and Ramsgate gently declined throughout Victoria's reign. The focus of the town's economy switched to fishing and more everyday tourism.  Even the town's harbour was supplanted when Dover built the Western Docks in 1848.  So, the last sight on embarkation from Britain was no longer the White Cliffs of Ramsgate, but the White Cliffs of Dover.

So today, much of Ramsgate's Regency heritage is still on view, creating a flourishing tourist trade for the various walks and trails on offer.  Wandering from Wellington Crescent on the East Cliff to the Royal Crescent on the West Cliff, you can follow the blue plaques to experience the whole gamut of military and social history from the period.  While down on the quay, there is a wide range of popular cafés and restaurants. Or you can take in the whole vista of the Royal Harbour from the vast sun-deck on top of the beautifully restored Royal Pavilion – the largest Wetherspoons in the country - where locals and holiday-makers alike enjoy the sun and the fresh sea air.

Electric Tramways & Lighting Co. Ltd.

On 3 August 1905, an unseasonably wet summer's day, Car No. 41, during a routine descent of the precipitous, and adverse camber leading down Madeira Walk hill into Ramsgate harbour, suddenly careered out of control, jumping the tracks, causing it to crash straight through the railings, so that it then dropped over the  cliff edge adjacent. Providentially, only a few passengers were travelling on Car No. 41 that day, and they came out of the ordeal unscathed, but the driver, who was new to the job, sustained some injury. The Electric Tramways & Lighting Co. Ltd. continued to operate with no further significant incidents recorded until its services were replaced with the buses of the East Kent Road Car Co, which began on 27 March 1937.

This was one of the few inter-urban tramways in Britain, owned by a private company and running through open countryside between the three towns (most of it built over now). Much of the route was on its own right of way, and this only became public roads when the tramway was abandoned.

The line started in Westbrook west of Margate, at the junction of Canterbury and Walton roads. A little tram-shed survived there until recently, and the tram-tracks were to be preserved in the housing development replacing it. Along Canterbury Road and the sea-front, then dividing in two. In the Broadstairs direction, up Paradise Street (now incorporated into Fort Hill dual carriageway); from Broadstairs, down Fort Hill and along King Street. Then Fort Crescent, Athelstan Road, Northdown Road to private track connecting to Lower Northdown Road. This bit is now a public footpath. Lower Northdown Road eastwards to the Wheatsheaf, then cuts across country to Northdown Hill. This bit is a rough track now. Past the main tramshed on the corner, still there and used as factory units, into Westover Road. Church Street (over railway) to St Peters, Albion Road to crossroads, left under railway bridge by Broadstairs station, along Broadstairs High Street to Queens Road, Oscott Road and the seafront. Then along private right of way to Ramsgate, now Dumpton Park Drive. Bellevue Road, Plains of Waterloo, Nelson Crescent, down Madeira Walk to Ramsgate Harbour. Up Royal Parade, Paragon, St Augustines Road, all the way along Grange Road, right at Park Road, to the old South Eastern Ry station where it had its own approach to the south of the station. This was the terminus.

There was also a short-cut between Ramsgate and St Peters called the Top Road, which ran from the crossroads by Broadstairs station, south along Osborne Road, Gladstone Road, across Ramsgate Road and on private right of way (now Salisbury Avenue) to the main line. This was very lightly used and no-one is sure why it was built. Broadstairs town wanted to build a proper town centre at the station crossroads before World War I but could not find the money, and this may have had something to do with it.

The company wanted to extend to Birchington, but was defeated by the landowners of housing estates at Westgate who wanted to keep the riff-raff away. Perhaps as a result, Westgate was refused its application to become a separate urban district because it lacked "civic character" before World War I (it became part of Margate). A line to Pegwell village was also proposed.

The trams were double-decker, but never had roofs on the upper deck, even in winter. This was because the track was narrow-gauge and there were many right-angle bends. Twelve could squeeze into the lower deck, where there were two wooden benches facing each other, but in bad weather the top deck was extremely unpleasant. The service could not hope to compete with buses all year round, even if the trams were fondly remembered on hot summer days.

Rail
Between 1863 and 1926 Ramsgate Harbour was served by its own railway station, and from 1936 to 1965 the harbour was linked to the railway at Dumpton Park by the Tunnel Railway underground railway system.

Ramsgate at war
Because of its proximity to mainland Europe, Ramsgate was a chief embarkation point during the Napoleonic Wars, and for the 1940 Dunkirk evacuation, when 4,200 ships left Ramsgate Harbour to rescue men from the Dunkirk beaches during World War II.

On 24 May 1990 the 50th anniversary of the evacuation of the Dunkirk evacuation was remembered when some 80 of the original 'little ships' gathered at Dover and Ramsgate to repeat the now historic crossing of the channel. Only six out of this fleet had any difficulties, but were assisted by others in the flotilla.

One of these little ships was the first Motor lifeboat stationed of Ramsgate which was named the 'Prudential' and had arrived on station by 1926. During World War II the Ramsgate lifeboat and crew were called out 60 times, greatly distinguishing themselves with the saving of 170 lives, in addition to the men brought back from Dunkirk: (Jeff Morris).

One of the Dunkirk 'little ships' still moored at Ramsgate and open to the public is the Motor Yacht Sundowner, (built 1912) once the private yacht of the second officer of the Titanic, C.H. Lightoller, whom surviving that fatal wreck later insisted personally at being at the helm during the evacuation of Dunkirk. He succeeded in bringing home 127 members of the British Expeditionary Force in just one trip.

After these events 42,783 soldiers were transported from Ramsgate railway station, carried by 82 southern rail special trains, the second busiest station during the evacuation, next to Dover, which carried over 180,000 men moved by 327 trains.

Shortly before the outbreak of World War II the local council, thanks in large part to the town Mayor Alderman Kempe, decided to enlarge the existing tunnels under the town as a public air-raid shelter - and after the war started the national government finally gave permission to spend the money - it was built and used a lot during the raids. See the Subterranea Britannica website for more details.

Airfields

In 1915-1916 early aircraft began to use the open farmlands at Manston as a site for emergency landings.  The location near the Kent coast gave Manston some advantages over the other previously established aerodromes.  By 1917 the Royal Flying Corps was well established and taking an active part in the defence of England.  The aerodrome played an important role in the second World War and is now known as Kent International Airport.

A municipal airport was opened on 1 July 1935, operating until the Second World War broke out in 1939. Following a short spell as a satellite of RAF Manston, it closed in 1940. The airport was re-opened in 1952 and operated until closure in 1968.

Vincent van Gogh
Artist Vincent van Gogh lived in Ramsgate for a year from April 1876, at the age of twenty-three. He boarded at 11 Spencer Square, and obtained work as a teacher at a local school in Royal Road. In one of his letters to his brother Theo, he described his surroundings, “There’s a harbour full of all kinds of ships, closed in by stone jetties running into the sea on which one can walk. And further out one sees the sea in its natural state, and that’s beautiful.” Many artists have been inspired by the light of Thanet, including J.M.W. Turner, who lived in nearby Margate.

See also
 Historic buildings in Ramsgate
 List of people from Ramsgate

References

External links
 RamsgateHistory.com (archive copy from 12 Sep 2017)
 The Ramsgate Society
 Blog with pictures looking at the air raid and smugglers tunnels under Ramsgate
 Pictures of Ramsgate from 1900 and from the same locations in 2006
 Subterranea Britannica - Ramsgate Tunnels
 walks in Ramsgate
 blue plaques in Ramsgate
 Historic England Ramsgate. The town and its seaside heritage

Ramsgate
Ramsgate
Ramsgate